Arnis at the 2019 Southeast Asian Games in the Philippines was held at the AUF Sports and Cultural Center in Angeles City from 1 to 3 December 2019.

Participating nations
Four nations participated in arnis.

Results

Men

Livestick

Padded stick

Anyo

Women

Livestick

Padded stick

Anyo

Medal table

References

External links
 

2019 Southeast Asian Games events